In the law of the United States, admission on motion refers to a procedure by which an attorney admitted to practice in one state or territory may obtain admission to practice in another state or territory without having to sit for the other jurisdiction's bar examination.  Instead, they simply file a motion or application with the state supreme court, board of bar examiners, or state bar association of the other jurisdiction, which typically must be accompanied by certificates of good standing from all other jurisdictions in which they are admitted and sufficient personal information to facilitate a background check of good moral character. 

In August 2012, the American Bar Association's Ethics 20/20 Commission published a report urging expansion of admission on motion, which noted that 40 jurisdictions (39 states and the District of Columbia) have already adopted it, and 11 states have not.

All jurisdictions that grant admission by motion require the applicant to show that they were admitted to the practice of law in another jurisdiction and actually practiced there for a certain period of time (typically three to seven years), to prevent law school graduates from abusing this privilege to bypass bar examinations in states perceived as more difficult.  Furthermore, many states only provide for admission on motion based on either an express reciprocal agreement or de facto reciprocity; that is, only if the applicant's home jurisdiction grants their own attorneys the same privilege.  

Some U.S. jurisdictions, such as Illinois, Massachusetts, Minnesota, Ohio, Tennessee, Texas, Wisconsin and the District of Columbia, will allow admission on motion of an attorney licensed in any state in lieu of taking their own bar examination, without the need to show reciprocity. 

Some states such as California, Florida, Louisiana, and South Carolina do not allow reciprocity or admission by motion for attorneys licensed in any other jurisdiction.

See also
Comity

References

External links
Database of Bar Admission and Reciprocity Rules from BarReciprocity.com
Comprehensive Guide to Bar Admission Requirements in the United States from the National Conference of Bar Examiners

Professional certification in law
State law in the United States